Lerd or Lard in Iran may refer to:
 Lerd, Ardabil
 Lerd, Semnan